Culver City Unified School District, abbreviated CCUSD, is a school district located in Culver City, California that serves approximately 6,500 pupils in a variety of schools.

The Culver City Unified School District primarily consists of five K-5 elementary schools, one middle school, and one high school.  It also includes an alternative high school, an independent study school, an adult school and a preschool program.

The current district superintendent is Quoc Tran.

One elementary school, El Marino Language School, has both a Spanish and Japanese language immersion program. It is a blue-ribbon school in the US, with top students coming from it every year.  Unlike the other four elementary schools in the district, El Marino does not have a neighborhood attendance area.  Instead, admission is based on a lottery system in compliance with the California Education Code.

Schools

Online school 
iAcademy (K-12), 4601 Elenda St, CP annex #6

Preschool
Office of Child Development (preschool), 10800 Farragut Drive

Elementary schools
El Marino Language School (K-5), 11450 Port Rd.
El Rincon School (K-5), 11177 Overland Ave.
Farragut School (K-5), 10820 Farragut Dr.
Howe (Linwood E.) Elementary School (K-5), 4100 Irving Pl.
La Ballona School (K-5), 10915 Washington Blvd.

Middle school   
Culver City Middle School (6-8), 4601 Elenda St. Culver City, CA

High schools

Culver City High School (9-12), 4401 Elenda St

Adult school

Culver City Adult School, 4909 Overland Ave.

Superintendents 
 Leslie Lockhart
 Joshua Arnold
 Dave LaRose

See also
 Culver City Academy of Visual and Performing Arts
 List of school districts in Los Angeles County, California

References

External links

Culver City Unified School District

Culver City, California
School districts in Los Angeles County, California